Through Times of War is the first studio album by Norwegian black metal band Keep of Kalessin. The album shows a combination of fast, dark and epic black metal. The band went on to embrace more elements from the thrash metal genre, receiving even more widespread appeal.

It was originally released through Avantgarde Music, but was re-released through several others. It was re-released through World War III in 2002, by Avantgarde Music a second time in 2006 and by Snapper that same year. Peaceville Records is known to re-release this album as a digipak in 2007.

Track listing

Personnel
 Arnt "Obsidian C." Ove Grønbech - guitars, synths
 Øyvind "Warach" A. Winther - bass
 Ghâsh - vocals
 Vegar "Vyl" Larsen - drums
 Torstein Parelius - lyrics ("Obliterator" and "Nectarous Red - Itch")

External links
 Official Site
 Encyclopaedia Metallum

1997 debut albums
Keep of Kalessin albums